Wrld on Drugs, also known and stylized as Future & Juice WRLD Present... WRLD ON DRUGS is a collaborative commercial mixtape by American rappers Future and Juice Wrld. It was released on October 19, 2018 by Epic Records, Freebandz, Grade A and Interscope Records after being originally announced on October 17, 2018. The lead single "Fine China" was released on October 15, 2018. The mixtape contains guest appearances from Young Scooter, Young Thug, Lil Wayne, Yung Bans, Gunna and Nicki Minaj.

Background
After the release of "Fine China", Wrld on Drugs was revealed as a joint project by both Future and Juice Wrld on their social media accounts. The project consists of sixteen songs. A handwritten track list featuring scribbling on a whiteboard was published by both the artists with the caption "Pluto x Juice #WRLDONDRUGS", which refers to Future as Pluto, a reference to Future's debut album Pluto. Future also revealed he and Juice Wrld have worked in the studio on the project, urging the latter to "make the cover artwork, pick the songs and put it out ASAP." He stated "Me & JuiceWorlddd in the studio rite now...we jus did enough heat to drop a tape this week." On the whiteboard, the phrases "whatever you addicted too" and "$$$ is a drug?" were written.

The Source has linked the album's title to the passing of rapper Mac Miller, stating "The title itself is interesting and speaks to the current state of Hip-Hop. With the recent drug-related passing of Pittsburgh rapper Mac Miller, one can wonder whether the project will be open about drug usage or mental illness in the world's biggest genre." HotNewHipHop suggested the drug naming in the song titles suggest there could exist a high number of drug references in the mixtape.

Singles
"Fine China" was released as a single on October 15, 2018. "Fine China" was recorded in July 2018 during a studio session between Future and Juice. Its making-of has been published by the rappers on their Instagram pages. They both visited the desert to shoot a music video for the album's second single, "No Issue".

Critical reception

Wrld on Drugs was met with mixed reviews. At Metacritic, which assigns a normalized rating out of 100 to reviews from professional critics, the album received an average score of 61, based on six reviews, indicating "generally favorable reviews".

Daniel Spielberger of HipHopDX said "Over the years, Future’s collaborations have occasionally demonstrated how easy it is for him to be overshadowed. With Wrld on Drugs, however, the Freebandz founder has struck up a natural rapport with a younger trap rapper while creating a unique atmosphere". Torii MacAdams of Pitchfork said "Too often, WRLD on Drugs caters to neither Future nor Juice WRLD's strengths. The teenager became a star not with gnashing street rap but earnestly sung (if naively written) anthems about rejection and endlessly malicious women".

In mixed reviews, XXL writer said "Overall, Wrld on Drugs is a mixed bag. Juice Wrld pushes Future in interesting ways, while growing stylistically himself. When he's not so embittered and combative, Juice's charm shines through". Jesse Bernard of Highsnobiety said "As with all of Future's releases this year, WRLD on Drugs could have benefitted from more precise and careful craftsmanship". RapReviews critic Steve "Flash" Juon said that "the album falls into the same category as so many mainstream charting rap albums (again using the term "rap" loosely) do these days—it's aight but it's not my thing. Do you like lots of bass? "Different" featuring Yung Bans and "No Issue" are guaranteed to vibrate your car. Do you like songs about flossing hard and blowing lots of money? The aforementioned "Red Bentley" and "Make It Back" definitely fit that vibe". Tommy Monroe of Consequence of Sound said "When Juice WRLD is in control, both rappers shine together. ... However, on Future's part, when he isn't outright struggling, he creates a whirlwind of lifeless tracks (especially his solo songs). This contributes to the heap of monotonous songs on the project". Claudia McNeilly of Now said "There are moments of greatness hidden within "Realer N Realer" and "Hard Work Pays Off", which both deliver relaxed, summery beats and glimpses into the emotional, razor-sharp lyricists that Juice and Future can be. But it isn't enough to save the album, which sounds more like an attempt at capitalizing on the artists' fame than the masterpiece it could've been".

Commercial performance
Wrld on Drugs debuted at number two on the US Billboard 200 behind A Star Is Born by Lady Gaga and Bradley Cooper, with 98,000 album-equivalent units, which included 8,000 pure album sales. It serves as Future's tenth top-ten album in the United States, and Juice Wrld's second. The album dropped to the number eight in its second week, earning an additional 45,000 album-equivalent units.

Track listing
Credits adapted from Tidal.

Notes
  signifies a co-producer
  signifies an uncredited co-producer

Personnel
Credits adapted from Tidal.

 Şerban Ghenea – mixing 
 Alex Tumay – mixing 
 Joe LaPorta – mastering 
 John Hanes – assistant engineering

Charts

Weekly charts

Year-end charts

Certifications

References

2018 mixtape albums
Future (rapper) albums
Juice Wrld albums
Albums produced by Cubeatz
Albums produced by Louis Bell
Albums produced by Murda Beatz
Albums produced by Don Cannon
Albums produced by Happy Perez
Pop albums by American artists
Pop-rap albums
Epic Records albums
Interscope Records albums